Vojtěch Patzel (born 23 September 1998) is a Czech handball player for HCB Karviná and the Czech national team.

He represented the Czech Republic at the 2020 European Men's Handball Championship.

References

1998 births
Living people
Czech male handball players
Sportspeople from Prague